Michal Jordán (born 17 July 1990) is a Czech professional ice hockey defenceman currently playing for SC Rapperswil-Jona Lakers of the National League (NL). He previously played for the Carolina Hurricanes of the National Hockey League (NHL). He was selected by the Hurricanes in the fourth round, 105th overall, of the 2008 NHL Entry Draft.

Playing career

Amateur
Prior to turning professional, Jordán played major junior ice hockey in the Ontario Hockey League (OHL) with the Windsor Spitfires and the Plymouth Whalers. At the end of his first season of major junior hockey, 2007–08, he was selected by the Carolina Hurricanes in the fourth round, 105th overall, at the 2008 NHL Entry Draft.

Professional
Jordán made his professional debut in the 2010–11 season with the Hurricanes' American Hockey League (AHL) affiliate, the Charlotte Checkers. On 9 October 2014, just prior to the commencement of the 2014–15 season, his fifth with the Checkers, Jordán was named team captain.

After six years within the Hurricanes organization, Jordán left as a free agent following the 2015–16 season. On October 7, 2016, he belatedly signed a one-year deal for the duration of the 2016–17 season with Ak Bars Kazan of the KHL. He was limited to 27 games with Kazan, contributing with 7 points.

As a free agent, Jordán opted to continue in the KHL, securing a two-year contract with Amur Khabarovsk on May 26, 2017.

During the 2019–20 season, in November 2019, amidst the controversy of Bill Peters racially-charged comments toward a former player of color, Jordán came to the forefront of NHL media as he described playing for Peters as an "...experience with the worst coach ever by far." He went on to describe how Peters would kick and punch him and others players in the head during a game.

Returning for his sixth season with Amur Khabarovsk in the 2022–23 season, Jordán as team captain, contributed with 2 goals and 11 points through 22 games. On 5 December 2022, Jordán opted to leave Amur and the KHL, agreeing to a contract for the remainder of the season with Swiss club, SC Rapperswil-Jona Lakers of the NL.

Career statistics

Regular season and playoffs

International

Awards and honours

References

External links
 

1990 births
Living people
Ak Bars Kazan players
Amur Khabarovsk players
Carolina Hurricanes draft picks
Carolina Hurricanes players
Charlotte Checkers (2010–) players
Czech expatriate ice hockey players in Russia
Czech ice hockey defencemen
Ice hockey players at the 2018 Winter Olympics
Olympic ice hockey players of the Czech Republic
Plymouth Whalers players
SC Rapperswil-Jona Lakers players
Windsor Spitfires players
Sportspeople from Zlín
Czech expatriate ice hockey players in the United States
Czech expatriate ice hockey players in Canada